Tripping Back Into the Broken Days is the seventh studio album by Lycia. It was released on July 9, 2002 by Projekt Records.

Track listing

Personnel 
Adapted from the Tripping Back Into the Broken Days liner notes.
Lycia
Mike VanPortfleet – vocals, synthesizer, guitar, drum machine, photography, design
Tara VanFlower  - Vocals
Production and additional personnel
Roger King – mastering
Steve Roach – mastering
Sam Rosenthal – design

Release history

References

External links 
 Tripping Back Into the Broken Days at Discogs (list of releases)
 Tripping Back Into the Broken Days at Bandcamp
 Tripping Back Into the Broken Days at iTunes

2002 albums
Lycia (band) albums
Projekt Records albums